List of champions of the 1905 U.S. National Championships tennis tournament (now known as the US Open). The men's tournament was held from 22 August to 31 August on the outdoor grass courts at the Newport Casino in Newport, Rhode Island. The women's tournament was held from 20 June to 24 June on the outdoor grass courts at the Philadelphia Cricket Club in Philadelphia, Pennsylvania. It was the 25th U.S. National Championships and the second Grand Slam tournament of the year.

Finals

Men's singles

 Beals Wright (USA) defeated  Holcombe Ward (USA) 6–2, 6–1, 11–9

Women's singles

 Elisabeth Moore (USA) defeated  Helen Homans (USA) 6–4, 5–7, 6–1

Men's doubles
 Holcombe Ward (USA) /  Beals Wright (USA) defeated  Fred Alexander (USA) /  Harold Hackett (USA) 6–4, 6–4, 6–4

Women's doubles
 Helen Homans (USA) /  Carrie Neely (USA) defeated  Marjorie Oberteuffer (USA) /  Virginia Maule (USA) 6–0, 6–1

Mixed doubles
 Augusta Schultz (USA) /  Clarence Hobart (USA) defeated  Elisabeth Moore (USA) /  Edward Dewhurst (USA) 6–2, 6–4

References

External links
Official US Open website

 
U.S. National Championships
U.S. National Championships (tennis) by year
U.S. National Championships
U.S. National Championships (tennis)
U.S. National Championships (tennis)
U.S. National Championships (tennis)
U.S. National Championships (tennis)